Lile Gibbons is an American politician and businesswoman.

Early life and education 
Gibbons was born and raised in Anchorage, Alaska, the daughter of Lile Bernard and Elmer E. Rasmuson. Gibbons's father served as president and chairman of the National Bank of Alaska, which his father founded. He later served as the Mayor of Anchorage from 1964 to 1967. Gibbons graduated from West Anchorage High School before earning her bachelor's degree in economics from Smith College.

Career 
Prior to her election to the Connecticut State Legislature, Gibbons served in town government and on her board of education. She was elected to the Connecticut House of Representatives in 2000 as a Republican. In February 2012, Gibbons announced she would not seek re-election, and she left office 2013 .

Gibbons and her husband, John, reside in Greenwich, Connecticut. They have four children and 13 grandchildren.

Notes

Year of birth missing (living people)
Living people
People from Greenwich, Connecticut
Smith College alumni
Businesspeople from Connecticut
School board members in Connecticut
Republican Party members of the Connecticut House of Representatives
Women state legislators in Connecticut
21st-century American women